Todtmoos is a village and municipality in the district of Waldshut in the southern part of Baden-Württemberg, Germany.

References

External links
  Images & Information

Waldshut (district)
Baden